Hošek is a Czech and Jewish surname. It has several parallel etymologies, as a diminutive for Hoch (boy/lad), or Hodislav (Czech first name) or as a variant of the Czech equivalent for Joshua. Notable people with the surname include:

 Chaviva Hošek (born 1946), Jewish Canadian academic, feminist and former politician
 Helga Hošková-Weissová, Czech painter
 Jan Hošek (born 1989), Czech football player 
 Karel Anton Hošek, Czech adventurer and revolutionary
 Petr Hošek (21st century), Czech guitarist and bassist
 Petr Hošek (Czech footballer) (born 1989), Czech football forward
 Václav Hošek, Czech athlete

See also
Rich Hosek (born 1964), American television writer

Czech-language surnames
Jewish surnames